Lepidium montanum is a species of flowering plant in the mustard family known by the common names mountain pepperweed, mountain peppergrass, mountain pepperwort, and mountain pepperplant. It is native to western North America from Oregon to Montana to northern Mexico, where it can be found in a number of habitats, often on salty or gravelly soils. There are several varieties, many of which are difficult to distinguish.

Description 
This is a short, spreading, shrublike biennial herb producing a rounded form up to about 40 centimeters tall and greater in width. The leaves near the base of the plant are up to 15 centimeters long and are divided into several toothed lobes; those further up on the stem are shorter and often undivided. The plant flowers abundantly in rounded to cylindrical inflorescences a few centimeters wide. Each small flower has white to cream-colored petals about 2 millimeters long and two to six stamens. The fruit is an oval-shaped capsule a few millimeters long.

Varieties
Varieties of the species include:
var. alpinum - alpine pepperweed, Wasatch pepperwort - endemic to Utah
var. claronense - mountain pepperweed, Casto Canyon pepperwort - endemic to Utah
var. coloradense - endemic to Colorado
var. neeseae - Elizabeth's pepperweed, Neese's pepperwort - endemic to Utah
var. nevadense - Pueblo Valley peppergrass - native to Oregon and Nevada

References

External links
The Jepson eFlora 2013
Photo gallery - var. cinereum

montanum
Flora of Northwestern Mexico
Flora of the Western United States
Flora of Baja California
Flora of California
Flora of Colorado
Flora of Utah
Flora of the Great Basin
Flora of the California desert regions
Flora of the Cascade Range
Plants described in 1838